James Victor Griffin (born September 7, 1961) is a former American football defensive back who played seven seasons in the National Football League (NFL).  He played college football at the Middle Tennessee State University.

External links
NFL.com player page

1961 births
Living people
People from Camilla, Georgia
American football safeties
Middle Tennessee Blue Raiders football players
Cincinnati Bengals players
Detroit Lions players